Francheville is a commune in the Orne department in north-western France.

See also
Communes of the Orne department
Parc naturel régional Normandie-Maine

References

Communes of Orne